The William Hill Sportswoman of the Year Award was an award, which was first handed out in 2011, after William Hill decided to launch an award with a women-only shortlist to vote for after the BBC failed to announce any female nominations for the 2011 BBC Sports Personality of the Year Award, which caused somewhat of a public outcry.

Now award has been given out since 2012.

Winners and nominees

2011

2012

See also

 List of sports awards honoring women

References 

William Hill
British sports trophies and awards
Sports awards honoring women
Awards established in 2011
Awards disestablished in 2012
2011 establishments in the United Kingdom
2012 disestablishments in the United Kingdom
Lists of British sportswomen